Jens Fiedler may refer to:

Jens Fiedler (canoeist), East German sprint canoer
Jens Fiedler (cyclist) (born 1970), German Olympic track cyclist
Jens Fiedler (handballer) (born 1966), German handball player